"Three Steps to Heaven" is a song co-written and recorded by Eddie Cochran, released in 1960. The record topped the charts in the Republic of Ireland and the United Kingdom posthumously for Cochran following his death in a car accident in April 1960. In the US it did not reach the Billboard Hot 100.

"Three Steps To Heaven" was recorded in January 1960 and featured Buddy Holly's Crickets on instruments. The song was written by Eddie Cochran and his brother Bob Cochran.

David Bowie used the guitar chord riff in his 1971 song "Queen Bitch" on his album Hunky Dory. He later made reference to the song title in the lyrics of "It's No Game" on 1980's Scary Monsters (And Super Creeps).

Personnel
 Eddie Cochran: vocal and rhythm guitar
 Sonny Curtis: guitar
 Conrad 'Guybo' Smith: electric bass
 Jerry Allison: drums

Chart performance

Cover versions
Showaddywaddy's 1975 cover version of this song was also a hit, reaching No. 1 in Ireland and No. 2 in the UK Singles Chart.

See also
List of posthumous number-one singles (UK)

References

External links
[ Three Steps to Heaven] - review of the Showaddywaddy version on allmusic.com

1960 singles
1975 singles
Eddie Cochran songs
Showaddywaddy songs
Irish Singles Chart number-one singles
UK Singles Chart number-one singles
Songs written by Eddie Cochran
Song recordings produced by Snuff Garrett
1960 songs
Liberty Records singles
London Records singles